Lucy Barton (1891 - 1979) was an American academic.

Born in Ogden, Utah, Barton received her bachelor's degree from the Carnegie Institute of Technology in 1917; in 1943 she received her master's degree at New York University. Four years later she took a position as a theater instructor at the University of Texas at Austin; she would go on to become the head of the drama department at the University of Alabama. She completed a textbook, Historic Costume for the Stage, that was published in 1935. It was followed in 1945 by another book, Period Patters, that acted as a complement to the first. The former volume has become a standard reference work in the field.

References

External Links
Lucy Barton Papers at the Harry Ransom Center

1891 births
1979 deaths
American women academics
People from Ogden, Utah
Academics from Utah
Carnegie Mellon University alumni
New York University alumni
University of Texas at Austin faculty
University of Alabama faculty
American textbook writers
Women textbook writers